City of Fathers is a 2009 South Korean film written and directed by Park Ji-won.

Plot
Kang-soo is a third-rate street thug in Busan; he's an alcoholic and gambling addict who's always on the run from loan sharks. But when his rebellious teenage son Jong-chul is diagnosed with kidney cancer, he tries to be a real parent for the first time and seeks out Jong-chul's biological father, Tae-suk, a pimp. Tae-suk, however, refuses to help.

Cast
 Kim Young-ho as Jo Tae-suk 
 Ko Chang-seok as Kim Kang-soo 
 Yoo Seung-ho as Kim Jong-chul 
 Cho Jin-woong as Han Sang-goo 
 Jung Sun-kyung as Lee Seon-hwa / Eun-ji 
 Lee Se-na as Soon-ae
 Jeon Joon-hong as Section chief Jang
 Jo Jae-yoon as Nal-chi ("Flying Fish")
 Kang Yoo-jin as Min-joo
 Kim Jin-hyeok as "Gecko"
 Kim Jung-tae as President Kim
 Do Young-gu as President Hee-sang
 Kim Jung-hak as President Byun 
 Baek Won-gil as Jjang-dol
 Kwon Jae-won as smuggled goods trader 
 Kim Seok-hwan as Bond 
 Kim Eun-seong as Jeong Yang
 Jo Ha-seok as Do-kki
 Kim Min-gyu as Room salon manager
 Hwang Seung-eon as Mi-na

References

External links
  
 
 

2009 films
2009 action drama films
South Korean action drama films
Films set in Busan
Films shot in Busan
Sponge Entertainment films
2000s Korean-language films
Sidus Pictures films
2000s South Korean films